Sunnyvale High School was the second public high school in the city of Sunnyvale, California.  Opened in January 1956 as part of the Fremont Union High School District, it was closed in 1981. In a nod to the nearby NAS Moffett Field, SHS adopted the Jets as its school mascot, and their fight song was to the tune of the U.S. Air Force song. Since 1991, the former SHS campus at 562 N. Britton Ave. has been home to The King's Academy, a Christian middle/high school.

Alumni
 Benny Brown, 1976 Olympic 4 x 400 meters relay gold medalist
 Robert Handa, Emmy winning and Associated Press Reporter of the Year

References

External links
Sunnyvale High School Alumni Association

See also
List of closed secondary schools in California

Defunct schools in California
Educational institutions disestablished in 1981
Public high schools in California
Education in Sunnyvale, California
1956 establishments in California